Rhagodidae is a family of solifuges, first described by Reginald Innes Pocock in 1897.

Genera
, the World Solifugae Catalog accepts the following twenty-seven genera:

Rhagodalma Roewer, 1933
Rhagodax Roewer, 1941
Rhagodeca Roewer, 1933
Rhagodelbus Roewer, 1941
Rhagoderma Roewer, 1933
Rhagoderus Roewer, 1933
Rhagodes Pocock, 1897
Rhagodessa Roewer, 1933
Rhagodeya Roewer, 1933
Rhagodia Roewer, 1933
Rhagodima Roewer, 1933
Rhagodinus Roewer, 1933
Rhagodippa Roewer, 1933
Rhagodira Roewer, 1933
Rhagodista Kraus, 1959
Rhagoditta Roewer, 1933
Rhagodixa Roewer, 1933
Rhagodoca Roewer, 1933
Rhagodolus Roewer, 1933
Rhagodomma Roewer, 1933
Rhagodopa Roewer, 1933
Rhagodorimus Turk, 1948
Rhagodorta Roewer, 1933
Rhagodospus Roewer, 1941
Rhagoduja Roewer, 1933
Rhagodula Roewer, 1941
Rhagoduna Roewer, 1933

References

Solifugae
Arachnid families